Keith Wylie Faulkner is a British academic specializing in the work of Gilles Deleuze. He received his Ph.D in philosophy from the University of Warwick, UK. He is known for authoring Deleuze and the Three Syntheses of Time on Deleuze's theory of time, which he calls the most important theory of time since Heidegger.

Reception 
According to Ansell-Pearson Faulkner's "treatment of Deleuze’s three syntheses of time provides the analytical depth and intellectual profundity lacking in existing accounts." Calling it a 'must' read for the serious student and scholar of Deleuze, he says it rewards anyone with an interest in philosophy of time. According to Daniel W. Smith, Faulkner "tackles one of the most important but also most difficult aspects of Deleuze’s philosophy - the theory of temporality (repetition) - and his analyses of the 'three syntheses' are not only rigorous and penetrating, but also accessible."

Bibliography 
Books
Deleuze and the Three Syntheses of Time (2006) London: Peter Lang. 
The Force of Time: An Introduction to Deleuze Through Proust (2008) Maryland: University Press of America. 

Articles
Faulkner, Keith W.  (2002). "Deleuze in Utero: Deleuze-Sartre and the Essence of Woman." Angelaki 7(3):25-43.

References 

Academics of the University of Warwick
Living people
British philosophers
Year of birth missing (living people)